Hochtann Mountain Pass is a mountain pass in the Austrian Alps in the Bundesland of Vorarlberg.

It connects Warth  in the Lech Valley to the east with the valley of the Bregenzer Ach near Schoppernau to the west. It is traversed by the Bregenzerwaldstraße (B 200). It connects the Allgäu Alps to the headwaters of the Lech.

See also
 List of highest paved roads in Europe
 List of mountain passes

External links 

 Profile on climbbybike.com

Mountain passes of the Alps
Mountain passes of Vorarlberg
Lechquellen Mountains